Sing(e)t dem Herr(e)n ein neues Lied is German for "sing unto the Lord a new song". The German expression may refer to:
 Psalm 96, "O sing unto the Lord a new song: sing unto the Lord, all the earth"
 Psalm 98, "O sing unto the Lord a new song; for he hath done marvellous things"
 Psalm 149, "... Sing unto the Lord a new song, and his praise in the congregation of saints"
 Singet dem Herrn ein neues Lied, SWV 35, Heinrich Schütz's setting of Psalm 98 in Psalmen Davids (1619).
 Singet dem Herrn ein neues Lied, SWV 194, Heinrich Schütz's setting of Psalm 96 in the Becker Psalter (1628).
 Singet dem Herrn ein neues Lied, SWV 196, Heinrich Schütz's setting of Psalm 98 in the Becker Psalter (1628).
 "Singet dem Herrn ein neues Lied," a Lutheran hymn by Matthäus Apelles von Löwenstern, based on Psalm 149 and published with the author's setting in 1644.
 Singet dem Herren ein neues Lied, SWV 342, setting in Heinrich Schütz's Symphoniae sacrae II (1647).
 Singet dem Herren ein neues Lied, BuxWV 98, cantata by Dieterich Buxtehude.
 Singet dem Herrn ein neues Lied, P 424, motet by Johann Pachelbel
 Singet dem Herrn ein neues Lied (Hoffmann), a 1708 cantata by Melchior Hoffmann, based on Psalm 96.
 Singet dem Herrn ein neues Lied, TWV 1:1342–1345, four cantatas with the same title by Georg Philipp Telemann
 Singet dem Herrn ein neues Lied, TWV 7:30, Telemann's setting of Psalm 96
 Singet dem Herrn ein neues Lied, BWV 190(.1), a 1724 cantata by Johann Sebastian Bach, with the words of the opening chorus based on Psalm 149.
 Singet dem Herrn ein neues Lied, BWV 225 a motet by Johann Sebastian Bach, with opening words based on Psalm 149, likely composed in the late 1720s.
 Singet dem Herrn ein neues Lied, BWV 190a (190.2), Johann Sebastian Bach's 1730 reworking of his 1724 cantata with the same name.
 "Singet dem Herrn ein neues Lied" (BWV 411), Johann Sebastian Bach's chorale harmonisation of Löwenstern's hymn tune, first published in the second half of the 18th century
 Singet dem Herrn ein neues Lied, BR-JCFB F 6, cantata by Johann Christoph Friedrich Bach (1785)
 Singet dem Herrn ein neues Lied (Mendelssohn), Felix Mendelssohn's Op. 91, setting Psalm 98 for eight-part choir and orchestra (1843)
 "Singet dem Herrn ein neues Lied" (Distler), Hugo Distler's Op. 12 Nr. 1
 "Singt dem Herrn ein neues Lied" (Kempf), a 1941 Christian hymn by Georg Alfred Kempf, with opening words reminiscent of Psalm 98.

See also
 "Nun singt ein neues Lied dem Herren"
 "Singet ein neues Lied"